Mogata is a locality situated in Söderköping Municipality, Östergötland County, Sweden with 301 inhabitants in 2010.

Notable residents
 Wilhelmina Gravallius (1809-1884), writer

References 

Populated places in Östergötland County
Populated places in Söderköping Municipality